Rh deficiency syndrome is a type of hemolytic anemia that involves erythrocytes whom membranes are deficient in Rh antigens. It is considered a rare condition.

See also
 List of hematologic conditions
 RHAG

References

External links 

Red blood cell disorders
Haemolytic anaemias
Rare syndromes
Syndromes affecting blood
Transfusion medicine